Allodemis stegopa is a species of moth of the family Tortricidae. It is found on Sumatra.

References

Moths described in 1983
Archipini
Moths of Indonesia
Taxa named by Alexey Diakonoff